Jabal Al-Mebraḥ, also commonly mistakenly referred to by the name of the nearby peak Jabal Yibir, is a  tall mountain in the United Arab Emirates (UAE).

Description
The peak sits within a larger raised massif, which has a gradual incline in general, however due to the steep sided wadis carving into its sides, and many faults and bulges in the landscape, it has many unnavigable sections surrounding the summit.

A military station is located on the summit making the peak out of access, however, a road has been built up from wadi Tawian, with many villages along the sides and tracks continuing further into the mountains. This has incrementally improved from a loose track to an increasingly widened asphalt road, since 2016 and onwards. This has had periods of being opened and closed with a military check point initially at the base of the mountain, then being moved up just over half way to the Fujairah/Ras al Khaimah border.

When defining a peak as a summit with at least  of prominence, Jebel Al Mebrah is among the tallest 4 peaks in the UAE.

In order, therefore make up the tallest prominent summits in the UAE

 Jabal ar Raḩraḩ (1,691 m)   Ras Al Khaimah - Coordinates 25.94419°N, 56.15219°E
 Jabal Sal (1,575 m)  Ras Al Khaimah (On the border between the UAE and Oman) - Coordinates 25.93251°N, 56.16921°E 
 Jabal Raḩabah (1,543 m)  Ras Al Khaimah - Coordinates 25.92610°N, 56.11689°E
 Jebel Al Mebrah (1,505 m) Fujairah - Coordinates 25.64860°N, 56.12860°E
 Jabal Yibir (1,489 m)  Ras Al Khaimah - Coordinates 25.667611°N, 56.135750°E

See also
 Geography of Oman
 Geography of the United Arab Emirates
 Geology of Oman
 Geology of the United Arab Emirates
 List of tourist attractions in the United Arab Emirates
 Musandam Peninsula (including the Ru'us al-Jibal)

References

External links
 Pictures of Jabal Yibir at TripAdvisor
 Jebel Yibir farm hike
 Jebel Yibir Group Hike, UAE,030416 (YouTube)
 Steep, Dangerous descent from Jebel Yibir
 Descending down from the Top of Jabal Yibir (NOT for the faint-hearted)
 Hiking: The Highest Points in the UAE

Jebel Al Mebrah
Al Hajar Mountains